Åke Persson (February 25, 1932 – February 5, 1975) was a Swedish bebop jazz trombonist.

Biography
Persson was born in Hässleholm, southern Sweden and started his music career by playing valve trumper in school.

Persson, known as "the Comet" (or "Kometen"), moved to Stockholm in 1951, where he played in Simon Brehm's quintet (1951–1954). Following this Persson worked with Arne Domnérus, Hacke Björksten, Harry Arnold's Radio Band (1956–1961), Quincy Jones, Lars Gullin, the RIAS Berlin band (1961–1975), and the Kenny Clarke-Francy Boland Big Band (1963–1971). Persson played with many American musicians, including George Wallington, Roy Haynes, Benny Bailey, Count Basie, Duke Ellington, and Dizzy Gillespie. He led several sessions for labels such as Metronome, Philips, and EmArcy in the 1950s.

Persson drowned in the Djurgården canal in central Stockholm in February 1975; he had driven his car into the canal either accidentally or deliberately. There is a book trombonist Åke Persson written by author Bo Carlsson.

Discography
With Benny Bailey
Quincy - Here We Come (Metronome, 1959) - also released as The Music of Quincy Jones (Argo)
With Count Basie
Basie in Sweden (Roulette, 1962)
With the Kenny Clarke/Francy Boland Big Band
Jazz Is Universal (Atlantic, 1962)
Handle with Care (Atlantic, 1963)
Now Hear Our Meanin' (Columbia, 1963 [1965])
Swing, Waltz, Swing (Philips, 1966)
Sax No End (SABA, 1967)
17 Men and Their Music (Campi, 1967)
All Smiles (MPS, 1968)
Faces (MPS, 1968)
Latin Kaleidoscope (MPS, 1968)
Fellini 712 (MPS, 1969)
All Blues (MPS, 1969)
More Smiles (MPS, 1969)
Clarke Boland Big Band en Concert avec Europe 1 (Tréma, 1969 [1992])
Off Limits (Polydor, 1970)
November Girl (Black Lion, 1970 [1975]) – with Carmen McRae
Change of Scenes (Verve, 1971) – with Stan Getz
With Duke Ellington
 Live at the Opernhaus Cologne 1969 (Delta Music, 2016)
With Stan Getz
Imported from Europe (Verve, 1958)
With Benny Golson
Stockholm Sojourn (Prestige, 1974)
With Quincy Jones
Jazz Abroad (Emarcy, 1955) also with Roy Haynes
Quincy's Home Again (Metronome, 1958) - also released as Harry Arnold + Big Band + Quincy Jones = Jazz! (EmArcy)
I Dig Dancers (Mercury, 1960)
With Herbie Mann
Mann in the Morning (Prestige, 1956 [1958])
With Oliver Nelson
Berlin Dialogue for Orchestra (Flying Dutchman, 1970)
With Sahib Shihab
Summer Dawn (Argo, 1964)
Companionship (Vogue Schallplatten, 1964-70 [1971])
With Jimmy Witherspoon
Some of My Best Friends Are the Blues (Prestige, 1964)

References

1932 births
1975 deaths
Swedish jazz musicians
Jazz trombonists
20th-century trombonists
Kenny Clarke/Francy Boland Big Band members
Deaths by drowning